Willapa is a census-designated place (CDP) in Pacific County, Washington, east of the city of Raymond. The population was 210 as of the 2010 census.  The name comes from that of the Willapa people, an Athapaskan-speaking people, now extinct, who occupied the Willapa River valley, which was similarly named after the Willapa people, along which the census-designated place Willapa is located.

Geography
Willapa is located at  (46.6754474, -123.6647525).

According to the United States Census Bureau, the CDP has a total area of 0.28 square miles (0.73 km), of which all of it (100.0%) is land and none of it (0.0%) is water.

Demographics

As of the census of 2010, there were 210 people, 81 households, and 62 families residing in the CDP. The population density was 755.4 people per square mile (291.7/km). There were 88 housing units at an average density of 316.5/sq mi (122.2/km). The racial makeup of the CDP was 95.7% White, 0.0% African American, 2.9% Native American, 0.0% Asian, 0.0% Pacific Islander, 0.0% from other races, and 1.4% from two or more races. Hispanic or Latino of any race were 2.9% of the population.

There were 81 households, out of which 32.1% had children under the age of 18 living with them, 65.4% were married couples living together, 7.4% had a female householder with no husband present, and 23.5% were non-families. 19.8% of all households were made up of individuals, and 27.2% had someone living alone who was 65 years of age or older. The average household size was 2.59 and the average family size was 2.90.

In the CDP, the age distribution of the population shows 24.3% under the age of 18, 5.2% from 18 to 24, 19.0% from 25 to 44, 39.0% from 45 to 64, and 12.4% who were 65 years of age or older. The median age was 45.5 years. For every 100 females, there were 92.7 males. For every 100 females age 18 and over, there were 96.3 males.

References

Census-designated places in Pacific County, Washington
Census-designated places in Washington (state)